Mario Ferrera García (born ) is a Spanish male volleyball player. He is part of the Spain men's national volleyball team. On club level he plays for Kifissia Atenas.

References

External links
 profile at FIVB.org

1987 births
Living people
Spanish men's volleyball players
Place of birth missing (living people)
People from Los Palacios y Villafranca
Sportspeople from the Province of Seville
Spanish expatriate sportspeople in Greece
Expatriate volleyball players in Greece
Expatriate volleyball players in France
Spanish expatriate sportspeople in France